Isobel Yeung (born ) is a British long-form documentary senior correspondent. She has covered a variety of stories concerning major global issues such as ongoing world conflicts, terrorism, mass detention, and genocide. She has also reported on social issues in developing countries such as gender roles, women's rights (e.g. in Afghanistan), mental health and corruption. Her work has earned her two Emmy Awards and a Gracie Award.

Early and personal life
Yeung was born on 2 November 1986 in Salisbury, England, to an English mother and Chinese father from Hong Kong. She was raised and spent most of her early life in Salisbury.

After high school, Yeung spent a year abroad in Asia, funding her travels through modeling for fashion brands and as editor for lifestyle publications. Yeung graduated the University of Nottingham in 2009, having studied at both the UK and China campuses. Then she moved to China and freelanced for a number of print publications and TV channels, including International Channel Shanghai and China Central Television.

In 2014, Yeung was hired by Vice News and relocated to the United States, settling in New York City. With Vice, she has predominantly been an on-air senior correspondent and producer for their flagship shows airing on HBO, specializing in long-form content and interviews. She is well-known for covering stories on gender discrimination and sexual consent.

Yeung has been dating British-Iranian journalist and director Benjamin Zand since 2017.

Investigative reporting

Reporting in Afghanistan 
In 2022, Yeung reported on the state of law and justice in Afghanistan following the 2021 Taliban takeover. Yeung also covered the situation of women's rights under the governance of the Taliban and the ongoing humanitarian crisis in the country stemming from a shortage of food and medical supplies as well as a collapsed economy.

Reporting in China 
In 2019, Yeung went undercover in Xinjiang, China, to investigate the internment camps for Uyghurs and other ethnic minorities in the Muslim-majority region, reporting on their mass detention, familial separation, and surveillance at the hands of Chinese authorities. Numerous times during her reporting, Yeung was followed, accosted, and had her camera footage deleted by Chinese police and security forces.

Reporting in Ukraine 
In early 2017, Yeung travelled to Sevastopol on the Crimean Peninsula, forcibly annexed in 2014 by the Russian Federation, to report how the annexation had changed life on the peninsula. Yeung dined at the invitation of Russian oligarch and ex-KGB officer Alexander Lebedev in Sevastopol where he explained his vision for the restoration of the once famous USSR tourist destination. Yeung also interviewed Oleg Zubkov, owner of the Taigan Zoo and Safari Park in Crimea, about the sharp decline in tourism since the annexation and the Ukrainian damming of the North Crimean Canal. Yeung attended a 2018 Ukrainian presidential ceremony featuring President Petro Poroshenko that marked the Ukrainian Orthodox Church's split from the Russian Orthodox Church for the first time in 300 years. During her visit, she interviewed Ukrainian Crimeans who reported nine months of detention and torture by FSB officers for resisting the Russian occupation, the information blackout on the peninsula by Russian authorities, and the opening of the Kerch Strait Bridge.

During the 2022 Russian invasion of Ukraine, Yeung travelled to the southern Ukrainian city of Mykolayiv, between the strategic coastal cities of Kherson and Odesa during the Battle of Mykolayiv. While touring the damaged city with Mayor Oleksandr Syenkevych, Yeung met with family of soldiers and civilians killed in Russian bombings of the city and filmed remnants of apparent cluster munitions. In meeting with 25 year-old Mykolayiv resident Olya, Yeung interviews both Olya and her aunt Svetlana who resides in Russia about the ongoing war. While speaking with Yeung, Svetlana describes the war's filtered coverage in Russia and how Ukrainians aren't seeing how "the Nazis torture people [in Ukraine]" and how "the Russian forces are liberating Ukraine from Nazis." Yeung also toured the trenches of the Ukrainian 79th Brigade to the east of the city, attended the funeral of a deceased Ukrainian soldier, and spoke to refugees fleeing the conflict.

Reporting in Yemen 
In 2018, Yeung travelled to Aden, Yemen, to report on the situation of the country's women during the Yemeni Civil War. In her Vice News report "The Women Fighting to Protect Yemen", she interviewed female fighters, child brides, domestic abuse victims, widows of the conflict, female protestors and chewed khat with government officials from the Yemeni Interior Ministry, where their takes on the country's problems related to gender discrimination, gender violence and financial displacement of Yemeni women were covered. She also interviewed former child soldiers of the Houthi movement.

Awards and recognition
Yeung earned two Emmy awards for her reporting  on Yemeni humanitarian crisis.
In 2019, Yeung was presented with the Marie Colvin Front Page Award for Foreign Correspondence. In 2017, Yeung won a Gracie Award for TV National Reporter/Correspondent for her work on Afghan Women’s Rights for Vice on HBO, and in 2016 she had been featured in a list of America's 50 Most Influential Women compiled by women's magazine Marie Claire.

References

External links
 Vice News Tonight: Correspondents: Isobel Yeung

1986 births
Living people
British journalists
British people of Chinese descent
British people of Hong Kong descent